Nabakevi Church is a church in the village of  , Gali municipality, Autonomous Republic of Abkhazia, Georgia. The church was built in the Middle Ages.

External links 
 Nabakevi Church Historical monuments of Abkhazia — Government of the Autonomous Republic of Abkhazia.

References 

Georgian Orthodox churches in Georgia (country)
Churches in Abkhazia